Thecostele is a monotypic genus of orchids (family Orchidaceae) and  of subtribe Cymbidiinae. The only species in the genus is Thecostele alata, first described as Cymbidium alatum by the Scottish botanist William Roxburgh in 1832. It was transferred to the genus Thecostele in 1874 by the English botanist Charles Samuel Pollock Parish and the German botanist Heinrich Gustav Reichenbach. It is native to tropical Asia and is found in northeastern India, Bangladesh, Myanmar, Thailand, Cambodia, Laos, Vietnam, Malaysia, Indonesia, and the Philippines. Two species formerly recognized in this genus (T. secunda and T. maingayi) were transferred to the new genus Thecopus by the Danish botanist Gunnar Seidenfaden in 1983, a decision supported by the number of pollinia and shape of the column.

References

External links 
 
 

Orchids of Asia
Cymbidieae genera
Cymbidiinae
Monotypic Epidendroideae genera